Lubani Al Saleh Teebi syndrome also known as cystic fibrosis-gastritis-megaloblastic anemia syndrome is a very rare autosomal recessive genetic disorder which consists of cystic fibrosis, helicobacter pylori-associated gastritis, folate-deficiency megaloblastic anemia and intellectual disabilities. This disorder was discovered when Lubani et  al reported two siblings from consanguineous parents with the symptoms mentioned above in 1991. Since then, there have been no further reports of this syndrome in medical literature.

References 

Cystic fibrosis
Anemias
Rare genetic syndromes
Syndromes with intellectual disability